Gene Loh'may refer to:

Eugene Loh, American physicist
Loh I-cheng, Chinese diplomat